John Henry Sánchez Valencia (born 15 May 1995) is a Colombian professional footballer who currently plays for USL Championship side Rio Grande Valley FC.

Club career

Rio Grande Valley FC
On 30 April 2021, Sánchez signed with USL Championship side Rio Grande Valley FC. He made his debut for the club on 16 May 2021, starting in a 2–1 win over San Antonio FC.

References

1995 births
Living people
Association football midfielders
Colombian footballers
Atlético Nacional footballers
Leones F.C. footballers
Alianza Petrolera F.C. players
C.D. Olimpia players
Deportivo Pasto footballers
Cortuluá footballers
Rio Grande Valley FC Toros players
Colombian expatriate footballers
Colombian expatriate sportspeople in Honduras
Colombian expatriate sportspeople in the United States
Expatriate footballers in Honduras
Expatriate soccer players in the United States
Categoría Primera A players
Categoría Primera B players
Liga Nacional de Fútbol Profesional de Honduras players
USL Championship players
People from Tumaco
Sportspeople from Nariño Department